The following is a partial list of the "C" codes for Medical Subject Headings (MeSH), as defined by the United States National Library of Medicine (NLM).

This list continues the information at List of MeSH codes (C07). Codes following these are found at List of MeSH codes (C09). For other MeSH codes, see List of MeSH codes.

The source for this content is the set of 2006 MeSH Trees from the NLM.

– respiratory tract diseases

– bronchial diseases

– asthma
  – asthma, exercise-induced
  – status asthmaticus

– bronchial fistula

– bronchial hyperreactivity

– bronchial neoplasms

– bronchial spasm

– bronchiectasis
  – kartagener syndrome

– bronchitis
  – bronchiolitis
  – bronchiolitis obliterans
  – bronchiolitis obliterans organizing pneumonia
  – bronchiolitis, viral
  – bronchitis, chronic

– bronchogenic cyst

– bronchopneumonia

– tracheobronchomegaly

– ciliary motility disorders

– kartagener syndrome

– laryngeal diseases

– granuloma, laryngeal

– laryngeal edema

– laryngeal neoplasms

– laryngismus

– laryngitis
  – croup

– laryngostenosis

– tuberculosis, laryngeal

– vocal cord paralysis

– voice disorders
  – aphonia
  – hoarseness

– lung diseases

– atelectasis
  – middle lobe syndrome

– bronchopulmonary dysplasia

– coin lesion, pulmonary

– cystic adenomatoid malformation of lung, congenital

– cystic fibrosis

– granuloma, plasma cell, pulmonary

– hemoptysis

– hypertension, pulmonary
  – persistent fetal circulation syndrome

– lung abscess

– lung diseases, fungal
  – aspergillosis, allergic bronchopulmonary
  – pneumonia, pneumocystis

– lung diseases, interstitial
  – alveolitis, extrinsic allergic
  – bird fancier's lung
  – farmer's lung
  – bronchiolitis obliterans
  – bronchiolitis obliterans organizing pneumonia
  – goodpasture syndrome
  – histiocytosis, langerhans-cell
  – pneumoconiosis
  – asbestosis
  – berylliosis
  – byssinosis
  – caplan's syndrome
  – siderosis
  – silicosis
  – anthracosilicosis
  – silicotuberculosis
  – pulmonary fibrosis
  – radiation pneumonitis
  – sarcoidosis, pulmonary
  – granulomatosis with polyangiitis

– lung diseases, obstructive
  – asthma
  – bronchitis
  – bronchiolitis
  – bronchiolitis obliterans
  – bronchiolitis obliterans organizing pneumonia
  – bronchiolitis, viral
  – bronchitis, chronic
  – pulmonary disease, chronic obstructive
  – bronchitis, chronic
  – pulmonary emphysema
  – lung, hyperlucent

– lung diseases, parasitic
  – echinococcosis, pulmonary

– lung neoplasms
  – carcinoma, bronchogenic
  – carcinoma, non-small-cell lung
  – carcinoma, small cell
  – coin lesion, pulmonary
  – pancoast's syndrome
  – pulmonary sclerosing hemangioma

– meconium aspiration syndrome

– pneumonia
  – bronchopneumonia
  – pleuropneumonia
  – pneumonia, aspiration
  – pneumonia, lipid
  – pneumonia, bacterial
  – pneumonia, mycoplasma
  – pneumonia of calves, enzootic
  – pneumonia of swine, mycoplasmal
  – pneumonia, pneumococcal
  – pneumonia, rickettsial
  – pneumonia, staphylococcal
  – pneumonia, pneumocystis
  – pneumonia, viral

– pulmonary alveolar proteinosis

– pulmonary edema

– pulmonary embolism

– pulmonary eosinophilia

– pulmonary veno-occlusive disease

– respiratory distress syndrome, adult

– respiratory distress syndrome, newborn
  – hyaline membrane disease

– scimitar syndrome

– silo filler's disease

– tuberculosis, pulmonary
  – silicotuberculosis

– nose diseases

– choanal atresia

– epistaxis

– granuloma, lethal midline

– nasal obstruction

– nose deformities, acquired

– nose neoplasms
  – paranasal sinus neoplasms
  – maxillary sinus neoplasms

– paranasal sinus diseases
  – paranasal sinus neoplasms
  – maxillary sinus neoplasms
  – sinusitis
  – ethmoid sinusitis
  – frontal sinusitis
  – maxillary sinusitis
  – sphenoid sinusitis

– rhinitis
  – rhinitis, allergic, perennial
  – rhinitis, allergic, seasonal
  – rhinitis, atrophic
  – rhinitis, vasomotor

– rhinoscleroma

– pleural diseases

– chylothorax

– empyema, pleural
  – empyema, tuberculous

– hemopneumothorax

– hemothorax

– hydropneumothorax

– hydrothorax

– pleural effusion
  – pleural effusion, malignant

– pleural neoplasms
  – pleural effusion, malignant

– pleurisy
  – pleuropneumonia

– pneumothorax

– tuberculosis, pleural
  – empyema, tuberculous

– respiration disorders

– apnea
  – sleep apnea syndromes
  – sleep apnea, central
  – sleep apnea, obstructive
  – obesity hypoventilation syndrome

– cheyne-stokes respiration

– cough

– dyspnea
  – dyspnea, paroxysmal

– hoarseness

– hyperventilation
  – alkalosis, respiratory

– laryngismus

– meconium aspiration syndrome

– mouth breathing

– respiratory distress syndrome, adult

– respiratory distress syndrome, newborn
  – hyaline membrane disease

– respiratory insufficiency
  – acidosis, respiratory
  – airway obstruction
  – nasal obstruction
  – granuloma, laryngeal
  – hantavirus pulmonary syndrome
  – hypoventilation
  – obesity hypoventilation syndrome
  – positive-pressure respiration, intrinsic
  – respiratory paralysis

– respiratory hypersensitivity

– alveolitis, extrinsic allergic
  – bird fancier's lung
  – farmer's lung

– aspergillosis, allergic bronchopulmonary

– asthma
  – asthma, exercise-induced
  – status asthmaticus

– rhinitis, allergic, perennial

– rhinitis, allergic, seasonal

– respiratory system abnormalities

– bronchogenic cyst

– bronchopulmonary sequestration

– choanal atresia

– cystic adenomatoid malformation of lung, congenital

– kartagener syndrome

– scimitar syndrome

– tracheobronchomegaly

– respiratory tract fistula

– bronchial fistula

– tracheoesophageal fistula

– respiratory tract infections

– bovine respiratory disease complex
  – pasteurellosis, pneumonic
  – pneumonia, atypical interstitial, of cattle
  – pneumonia of calves, enzootic

– bronchitis
  – bronchiolitis
  – bronchiolitis, viral
  – bronchitis, chronic

– common cold

– empyema, pleural
  – empyema, tuberculous

– influenza, human

– laryngitis
  – epiglottitis

– legionellosis
  – legionnaires' disease

– lung abscess

– lung diseases, fungal
  – aspergillosis, allergic bronchopulmonary
  – pneumonia, pneumocystis

– lung diseases, parasitic
  – echinococcosis, pulmonary

– pharyngitis

– pleurisy
  – pleuropneumonia

– pneumonia
  – bronchopneumonia
  – pleuropneumonia
  – pneumonia, aspiration
  – pneumonia, lipid
  – pneumonia, bacterial
  – pneumonia, mycoplasma
  – pneumonia of calves, enzootic
  – pneumonia of swine, mycoplasmal
  – pneumonia, pneumococcal
  – pneumonia, rickettsial
  – pneumonia, staphylococcal
  – pneumonia, pneumocystis
  – pneumonia, viral

– rhinitis

– rhinoscleroma

– severe acute respiratory syndrome

– sinusitis
  – ethmoid sinusitis
  – frontal sinusitis
  – maxillary sinusitis
  – sphenoid sinusitis

– tonsillitis
  – peritonsillar abscess

– tracheitis

– tuberculosis, laryngeal

– tuberculosis, pleural
  – empyema, tuberculous

– tuberculosis, pulmonary
  – silicotuberculosis

– whooping cough

– respiratory tract neoplasms

– bronchial neoplasms

– laryngeal neoplasms

– lung neoplasms
  – carcinoma, bronchogenic
  – carcinoma, non-small-cell lung
  – carcinoma, small cell
  – coin lesion, pulmonary
  – pancoast's syndrome
  – pulmonary sclerosing hemangioma

– nose neoplasms
  – paranasal sinus neoplasms
  – maxillary sinus neoplasms

– pleural neoplasms
  – pleural effusion, malignant

– tracheal neoplasms

– thoracic diseases

– mediastinal diseases
  – mediastinal cyst
  – mediastinal emphysema
  – mediastinal neoplasms
  – mediastinitis

– tracheal diseases

– tracheal neoplasms

– tracheal stenosis

– tracheitis

– tracheobronchomegaly

– tracheoesophageal fistula

The list continues at List of MeSH codes (C09).

C08